Nanao may refer to:

Places
, Japan
Nanao Line a rail line through Nanao, Ishikawa
Nanao Station a station on the Nanao Line
Nan'ao County, Shantou, Guangdong
Nan'ao Island, forming most of Nan'ao County
Nan'ao Subdistrict, a subdistrict of Shenzhen, Guangdong
Nan-ao, Yilan, a township in Yilan County, Taiwan

People 
Haruhi Nanao (born 1973), Japanese voice actress
Nanao (model) (born 1988), Japanese model
Naru Nanao, a Ryukyuan artist
Nanao Sakaki (1923–2008), Japanese poet
Tavito Nanao (born 1979), Japanese singer-songwriter who debuted in 1998
Nanao Singh Thokchom (born 1991), Indian boxer

Characters 
Nanao Ise, a character in the Bleach series

Other
The Eizo Nanao Corporation, a manufacturer of high-quality computer displays

Japanese-language surnames
Japanese masculine given names